The 2012–13 Wessex Football League (known as the Sydenhams Football League (Wessex) for sponsorship reasons) was the 27th season of the Wessex Football League since its establishment in 1986.

The league consisted of two divisions: the Premier Division and Division One. Both divisions this season consisted of fewer teams than last season – the Premier Division had 21 teams and Division One had 16 teams.

Premier Division

The Premier Division featured 21 teams, reduced from 22 the previous season, after Winchester City were promoted to the Southern League, Laverstock & Ford were relegated to Division One, and Brading Town withdrew from the league.

Two new teams joined the Premier Division, both promoted from Division One:

A.F.C. Portchester
Verwood Town
Only Newport (IOW) applied for promotion from this league, and would have been promoted if they had finished in any of the top three places and their application was accepted. However, they failed to achieve a high enough finish, so there was no promotion this season.
New Milton Town were to resign from the Wessex League at the end of the season in preparation for their merger with Bashley of the Southern League. On 13 May it was reported that New Milton had pulled out of the merger, and were preparing for at least another season in the Wessex League.

League table

Results grid

Stadia and locations

Division One

Division One featured 16 teams, reduced from 18 the previous season after AFC Portchester and Verwood Town were promoted to the Premier Division, and Warminster Town transferred to the Western League.

One new team joined, relegated from the Premier Division:

Laverstock & Ford

League table

Results grid

Stadia and locations

References

External links
 Wessex Football League official site

Wessex Football League seasons
9